"Younger Girl" is a song written by John Sebastian and originally recorded by his band, the Lovin' Spoonful, for their 1965 debut album Do You Believe in Magic. The tune and lyric are based upon "Prison Wall Blues" (1930) by Cannon's Jug Stompers.

Two versions charted in the U.S., both released in 1966. The American pop group the Critters' version (Kapp 752), the title track from their debut LP, reached number 42 on Billboard's Hot 100 and number 21 on the Cash Box Top 100, peaking on both charts on July 9. In Canada, "Younger Girl" reached number 9. On the UK Singles Chart, it reached number 38. The song was also covered by the West Coast studio group and surf act The Hondells (Mercury 72563), peaking July 2, at number 52 Billboard and number 38 ''Cash Box.

Chart performance
The Critters version

The Hondells version

References

External links
  (The Critters)
  (The Lovin' Spoonful)

1965 songs
1966 singles
The Lovin' Spoonful songs
Songs written by John Sebastian
Song recordings produced by Artie Ripp